Alexandre Vincent may refer to:

 Alexandre Vincent (footballer) (born 1994), French footballer 
 Alexandre Vincent (ice hockey) (born 1986), ice hockey player